Johnson Cottage is a historic cure cottage located at Saranac Lake in the town of Harrietstown, Franklin County, New York.  It was built about 1896 and is a two-story frame structure, square in form and surmounted by a metal hipped roof. The roof extends on all four sides to subsidiary hipped roofs covering an unusual number of porches.  It contains two apartments and each has four porches, added to the building about 1915.  It features "over-under" verandahs at the southwest and northeast corners.

It was listed on the National Register of Historic Places in 1992.

References

Houses on the National Register of Historic Places in New York (state)
Houses completed in 1896
Houses in Franklin County, New York
National Register of Historic Places in Franklin County, New York